Évariste Ngoyagoye (born 3 January 1942 in Jenda, Burundi) is the archbishop of the Roman Catholic Archdiocese of Bujumbura. He has worked in that position since 2006, having previously been a bishop in the Roman Catholic Diocese of Bujumbura since 1997.

Ngoyagoye was ordained priest on 6 January 1966. Prior to working in Bujumbura, he had been as the Bishop of Bubanza since 1980.

References

External links 

 Catholic-hierarchy.org: Evariste Ngoyagoye

1942 births
Living people
Burundian Roman Catholic archbishops
20th-century Roman Catholic bishops in Burundi
21st-century Roman Catholic archbishops in Africa
Roman Catholic bishops of Bubanza
Roman Catholic bishops of Bujumbura
Roman Catholic archbishops of Bujumbura